Mišići may refer to:
 Mišići (Bar Municipality), Montenegro
 "Mišići" (song), by Slovenian singer-songwriter Senidah
 Mišići, a village in Milići, Republika Srpska, Bosnia and Herzegovina